Dorianne Laux (born January 10, 1952 in Augusta, Maine) is an American poet.

Biography
Laux worked as a sanatorium cook, a gas station manager, and a maid before receiving a B.A. in English from Mills College in 1988.

Laux taught at the University of Oregon. She is a professor at North Carolina State University’s creative writing program, and the MFA in Writing Program at Pacific University. She is also a contributing editor at The Alaska Quarterly Review.

Her work appeared in American Poetry Review, Five Points, Kenyon Review, Ms., Orion, Ploughshares, Prairie Schooner, Southern Review, TriQuarterly, Zyzzyva. She has also appeared in online journals such as Web Del Sol.

Laux lives in Raleigh, North Carolina with her husband, poet Joseph Millar. She has one daughter.

Awards
 Pulitzer Prize finalist for Only As the Day is Long: New and Selected Poems 
 The Paterson Prize for The Book of Men
 The Roanoke-Chowan Award for The Book of Men
 Pushcart Prize
 Two fellowships from the National Endowment for the Arts
The Best American Poetry 1999
The Best American Poetry 2006
The Best American Poetry 2013
The Best American Poetry 2017
List of Guggenheim Fellowships awarded in 2001
 Oregon Book Award for Facts about the Moon, selected by Ai
 2006 Lenore Marshall Poetry Prize shortlisted for Facts about the Moon
 National Book Critics Circle Award finalist for What We Carry

Works
  re-issued by Eastern Washington University Press
  
 
 
 Superman: The Chapbook Red Dragonfly Press January 2008
 Dark Charms Red Dragonfly Press 2010
 
 The Book of Women, Red Dragonfly Press 2012 
 Ce que nous portons, Translation of What We Carry by Hélène Cardona, Editions du Cygne 2014 
Only As the Day Is Long: New and Selected Poems, W. W. Norton 2019

Anthologies
 Best of The American Poetry Review
 The Norton Anthology of Modern and Contemporary Poetry
 four citations in Best American Poetry.

Performance
 The Poetry Brothel The Poetry Society of New York''

As editor

References

External links
 
 Guide to the Dorianne Louise Laux Papers 1968-2019
 Dorianne Laux's poem "Home Movies" in Gulf Coast: A Journal of Literature and Fine Arts (23.1).

Gave a review to poet Jessica Cuello's book "Liar."

1952 births
Living people
Pacific University faculty
People from Augusta, Maine
Writers from Eugene, Oregon
Writers from Raleigh, North Carolina
University of Oregon faculty
North Carolina State University faculty
American women poets
20th-century American poets
20th-century American women writers
Mills College alumni
Poets from Maine
Poets from Oregon
21st-century American poets
21st-century American women writers